Eupatorium chinense is a plant species in the family Asteraceae.  The exact boundaries of this species have been defined differently by different authors.  King and Robinson's 1987 paper defines it broadly, to include Eupatorium japonicum, Eupatorium makinoi, some varieties of Eupatorium fortunei, and other plants sometimes considered to be separate species.

Toxicity
Eupatorium chinense contains tumorigenic pyrrolizidine alkaloids.

References

chinense
Plants described in 1753
Taxa named by Carl Linnaeus